Dart Totnes Amateur Rowing Club is a rowing club on the River Dart, based at Steamer Quay Road, Totnes, Devon.

History
The club has a fleet of 35 boats and a boathouse on the River Dart that was built in 1985 which contains an ergo room  was founded in 2008 and is affiliated to British Rowing.

The club competes in the British Rowing Championships and won the men's lightweight double sculls at the 1981 British Rowing Championships.

Honours

British champions

References

Sport in Devon
Rowing clubs in England
Totnes